WYFJ (99.9 FM) is a conservative religious formatted broadcast radio station licensed to Ashland, Virginia, serving Metro Richmond.  WYFJ is owned and operated by Bible Broadcasting Network.

History
This station signed on the air in 1967 as WIVE-FM. The station, along with sister WIVE-AM did a locally based religious format and also operated a Christian bookstore out of their facility on Ashcake Road in Hanover County. In the early eighties, WIVE-FM was sold to the Bible Broadcast Network, who changed the callsign to WYFJ and moved the FM station to facilities on Washington Highway.  The AM station was not part of the purchase.

The station moved from 100.1 MHz to 99.9 MHz on July 24, 2010.  As part of the switch, the station's transmitter moved from Ashland to a location near The Diamond in Richmond.

References

External links
 Bible Broadcasting Network Online
 

Bible Broadcasting Network
Radio stations established in 1967
YFJ
1967 establishments in Virginia
Hanover County, Virginia